L'Amadigi is an epic poem written in Italian by Bernardo Tasso and first published in 1560. It was inspired by the Amadís de Gaula of Garci Rodríguez de Montalvo.

This poem has inspired Floridante (sometimes misspelt as Florindante), that remained incomplete because of the death of the author. The son of Bernardo, the famous poet Torquato, completed it and published it in 1587.

References

External links
 L'Amadigi

1560 books
Renaissance literature
Epic poems in Italian
Italian poems